Finnish regional road 110, or Turku Road, is the leading regional road from Helsinki to Turku. The road is a parallel to the former Highway 1 and the current Highway 1 (E18).

Regional road 110 actually starts at the Haaga roundabout. In it, it differs from regional road 120, or Vihdintie, which again starts at the northern end of Mannerheimintie. The road runs from Helsinki through Veikkola to Saukkola and Nummenkylä in Lohja and from there through Salo's Kitula, Muurla and the center of Salo to Kupittaa in Turku. The alignment of the road partly follows the old king's road.

References

External links 

Roads in Finland
Transport in Helsinki
Transport in Espoo
Transport in Turku